Ekavali Khanna is an actress who stars in Bollywood, Hollywood and Bengali films.

Early life 
Born in Kolkata, Khanna attended Modern High School and is a graduate of Delhi University.
She is of mixed Punjabi and Goan heritage. Khanna divides her time between both Mumbai and Kolkata depending on her work, and culturally identifies as a Bengali.

Career 

Ekavali Khanna made her debut with Kaun Kitne Pani Main, directed by national award winner Nila Madhab Panda in the year 2014. The same year she worked with another national award-winning director Dr. Chandra Prakash Dwivedi in the film Zed Plus as the parallel lead opposite Adil Hussein. In 2014 and 2015 she did two more films: Daasdev by Sudhir Mishra and Satra Ko Shaadi Hai, directed by Arshad Sayed. She also did a guest appearance in Bollywood Diaries directed by K.D Satyam. Her next release in 2015 was Dear Dad, opposite Arvind Swamy, directed by Tanuj Brahmar. In 2017 she acted in Bioscopewallah, directed by Deb Medhkar and Angrezi mein kehte Hain , directed by Harish Vyas for which she won best actor at Oiffa 2018. In 2017 she acted in the Norwegian film What will people say, as Najma she got critically acclaimed globally, the movie directed by Iram Haq was the official entry to the Oscars in 2019.

In 2018 she acted in the Hollywood film 'Line of Descent', directed by Rohit Karn Batra. She also played a pivotal role in Veere Di Wedding, directed by Shashank Ghosh where she stole hearts with her lively Paromita. In the same year she played a role in Chotte Nawab' directed by Kumud Chaudhary, Dark light directed by Mayur Hardas, Yaarjigri directed Amit Joshi, Anaam directed by Ganesh Shetty and Aadhar directed by Suman Ghosh.

She has also appeared in Bangla films like Katmandu, directed by Raj Chakroborty, Dwando directed by Suman Ghosh, and 'Nirontor', directed by Chandrashish Ray.

Filmography

See also 

Cinema of India
Bollywood
Cinema of West Bengal

References 

Actresses in Bengali cinema
Living people
Actresses in Hindi cinema
Bengali actresses
Actresses from Kolkata
Year of birth missing (living people)